Selim Kakış (born 16 June 1973 in Istanbul) is an dinghy sailor from Turkey. He has competed in the Laser Radial and 470 (dinghy) class.

He is 1995 European Champion in the Laser Radial class and was third in the World Championship in 1997.

In 2001, he took the silver medal in the 470 class at 2001 Mediterranean Games with Hasan Kaan Özgönenç.

He represented his country at 2004 Summer Olympics in the 470 class with Hasan Kaan Özgönenç. They finished 24th. His father Haluk and older brother İbrahim also represented their country in the sailing at the Summer Olympics.

References

External links
 
 
 

1973 births
Living people
Turkish male sailors (sport)
Olympic sailors of Turkey
Sailors at the 2004 Summer Olympics – 470
Mediterranean Games silver medalists for Turkey
Mediterranean Games medalists in sailing
Competitors at the 2001 Mediterranean Games
Extreme Sailing Series sailors
Sportspeople from Istanbul